Cardenas J. Alban (born 1975) is a former Staff Sergeant in the United States Army from Inglewood, California who was convicted of the murder of Qassim Hassan, a sixteen-year-old Iraqi. The teenager was found with severe abdominal injuries and burns, and the shooting was described as a "mercy killing." Alban was sentenced to one year's confinement, demoted to Private and given a bad conduct discharge. Johnny M. Horne Jr. pleaded guilty in the same case.

References

External links

'Mercy killing' of Iraqi revives GI conduct debate Teen rubbish patrol shot up by troops -- wounded youth slain
Wartime murder prosecutions sometimes end with dismissals
Prisoner Deaths in U.S. Custody
Short sentences, dismissals show wartime murder prosecutions hard
Army Investigators Says 27 Iraqis and Afghans Killed in U.S. Custody 

Living people
1975 births
People from Inglewood, California
American people convicted of murder
American people convicted of war crimes
United States Army personnel of the Iraq War
United States Army soldiers
American murderers of children
People convicted of murder by the United States military
United States military war crimes
War crimes in Iraq